Beatrice Cenci is a 1909 Italian silent historical film directed by Mario Caserini and starring Maria Caserini, Renato De Grais and Fernanda Negri Pouget. It is one of several films portraying the story of the sixteenth century Italian noblewoman Beatrice Cenci.

Cast
 Maria Caserini as Beatrice Cenci 
 Renato De Grais
 Fernanda Negri Pouget
 Ettore Pesci
 Alessandro Rinaldi

References

Bibliography
 Waters, Sandra. Narrating the Italian Historical Novel. ProQuest, 2009.

External links
 

1909 films
1900s historical drama films
1900s Italian-language films
Italian silent short films
Italian historical drama films
Films directed by Mario Caserini
Films set in the 16th century
Italian black-and-white films
Cultural depictions of Beatrice Cenci
Silent historical drama films